This page details the books featuring the fictional character Hercule Poirot, created by Agatha Christie.

Hercule Poirot and fictional canon

Only works written by Christie (including short stories, the novels and her play Black Coffee) are considered canon by most fans and biographers. 

The Poirot books are still under copyright in the United Kingdom. The Mysterious Affair at Styles, The Murder on the Links  and Poirot Investigates are now public domain in the US but will not become public domain in the UK until 2046 (70 years after Christie's death). Christie's grandson, Mathew Prichard, now owns the copyright to his grandmother's works.

In 2014, the Christie estate authorised author Sophie Hannah to write a new Poirot book, The Monogram Murders. She later also wrote Closed Casket (2016), The Mystery of Three Quarters (2018) and The Killings At Kingfisher Hill (2020).

Hercule Poirot Series in publication order 

Short story collections listed as "ss"

The Mysterious Affair at Styles (1920)
The Murder on the Links (1923)
Poirot Investigates (1924, ss)
The Murder of Roger Ackroyd (1926)
The Big Four (1927)
The Mystery of the Blue Train (1928)
Black Coffee (1930 play) (A novelization by Charles Osborne was published in 1998.)
Peril at End House (1932)
Lord Edgware Dies (1933) also published as Thirteen at Dinner
Murder on the Orient Express (1934) also published as Murder in the Calais Coach
Three Act Tragedy (1935) also published as Murder in Three Acts
Death in the Clouds (1935) also published as Death in the Air
The A.B.C. Murders (1936) also published as The Alphabet Murders
Murder in Mesopotamia (1936)
Cards on the Table (1936)
Murder in the Mews (1937, ss) also published as Dead Man's Mirror
Dumb Witness (1937) also published as Poirot Loses a Client
Death on the Nile (1937) also published as Murder on the Nile and as Hidden Horizon
Appointment with Death (1938)
Hercule Poirot's Christmas (1938) also published as Murder for Christmas and as A Holiday for Murder
The Regatta Mystery and Other Stories (1939, ss)
Sad Cypress (1940)
One, Two, Buckle My Shoe (1940) also published as An Overdose of Death and as The Patriotic Murders
Evil Under the Sun (1941)
Five Little Pigs (1942) also published as Murder in Retrospect
The Hollow (1946) also published as Murder after Hours
The Labours of Hercules (1947, ss)
The Witness for the Prosecution and Other Stories (1948, ss)
Taken at the Flood (1948) also published as There Is a Tide
Three Blind Mice and Other Stories (1950, ss)
The Under Dog and Other Stories (1951, ss)
Mrs McGinty's Dead (1952) also published as Blood Will Tell
After the Funeral (1953)  also published as Funerals are Fatal
Hickory Dickory Dock (1955) also published as Hickory Dickory Death
Dead Man's Folly (1956)
Cat Among the Pigeons (1959)
The Adventure of the Christmas Pudding (1960, ss)
Double Sin and Other Stories (1961, ss)
The Clocks  (1963)
Third Girl (1966)
Hallowe'en Party (1969)
Elephants Can Remember (1972)
Poirot's Early Cases (1974, ss)
Curtain (written about 1940, published 1975) also published as Curtain: Poirot's Last Case
Problem at Pollensa Bay and Other Stories (1991, ss)
The Harlequin Tea Set (1997, ss)
While the Light Lasts and Other Stories (1997, ss)

Continuations not by Christie 

 The Monogram Murders, written by Sophie Hannah (published 2014)
 Closed Casket, written by Sophie Hannah (published 2016)
 The Mystery of Three Quarters, written by Sophie Hannah (published 2018)
 The Killings at Kingfisher Hill, written by Sophie Hannah (published 2020)
 Hercule Poirot's Silent Night, written by Sophie Hannah (to be published 2023)

Books and short stories in chronological order

Poirot's police years
 "The Chocolate Box" (short story from Poirot's Early Cases)

Career as a private detective and retirement

Shortly after Poirot flees to England (1916–1919)
 The Mysterious Affair at Styles
 "The Affair at the Victory Ball" (short story from Poirot's Early Cases)
 "The Kidnapped Prime Minister" (short story from Poirot Investigates)

The Twenties (1920–1929)
Poirot settles down in London and opens a private detective agency. These are the short story years (26 short stories and only 4 novels).

 "The Jewel Robbery at the Grand Metropolitan" (short story from Poirot Investigates)
 "The King of Clubs" (short story from Poirot's Early Cases)
 "The Disappearance of Mr Davenheim" (short story from Poirot Investigates)
 "The Plymouth Express" (short story from Poirot's Early Cases)
 "The Adventure of the Western Star" (short story from Poirot Investigates)
 "The Tragedy at Marsdon Manor" (short story from Poirot Investigates)
 "The Million Dollar Bond Robbery" (short story from Poirot Investigates)
 "The Adventure of the Cheap Flat" (short story from Poirot Investigates)
 "The Mystery of the Hunters Lodge" (short story from Poirot Investigates)
 "The Adventure of the Egyptian Tomb" (short story from Poirot Investigates)
 "The Veiled Lady" (short story from Poirot's Early Cases)
 "The Adventure of Johnny Waverly" (short story from Poirot's Early Cases)
 "The Market Basing Mystery" (short story from Poirot's Early Cases)
 "The Adventure of the Italian Nobleman" (short story from Poirot Investigates)
 "The Case of the Missing Will" (short story from Poirot Investigates)
 "The Submarine Plans" (short story from Poirot's Early Cases)
 "The Adventure of the Clapham Cook" (short story from Poirot's Early Cases)
 "The Lost Mine" (short story from Poirot's Early Cases)
 "The Cornish Mystery" (short story from Poirot's Early Cases)
 "The Double Clue" (short story from Poirot's Early Cases)
 "The Lemesurier Inheritance" (short story from Poirot's Early Cases)
 Murder on the Links
 "Christmas Adventure" (short story from "While the Light Lasts and Other Stories")
 The Big Four
 The Murder of Roger Ackroyd
 "The Under Dog" (short story from The Under Dog and Other Stories)
 The Mystery of the Blue Train is an expanded version of "The Plymouth Express"
 "Double Sin" (short story from Poirot's Early Cases)
 "Wasp's Nest" (short story from Poirot's Early Cases)
 "The Third Floor Flat" (short story from Poirot's Early Cases)

The Thirties (1930–1939) and World War II 
Christie increased her novel production during this time (16 novels, 24 total short stories and 1 theatre play). Twelve short stories form The Labours of Hercules. The other short stories listed here take place in this period but were published before and after the publication of Hercules. The theatre play is named Black Coffee and was written by Agatha Christie, who stated a frustration with other stage adaptations of her Poirot mysteries. In 1998, author Charles Osborne adapted the play into a novel.

 Black Coffee
 Peril at End House
 "The Mystery Of The Baghdad Chest" (short story from "The Regatta Mystery")
 "The Second Gong" (short story from "Problem at Pollensa Bay and Other Stories")
 Lord Edgware Dies, also published as Thirteen at Dinner
 Murder in Mesopotamia
 Murder on the Orient Express also published as Murder in the Calais Coach
 Three Act Tragedy, also published as Murder in Three Acts
 Death in the Clouds
 "How Does Your Garden Grow?" (short story from Poirot's Early Cases and The Regatta Mystery)
 The A.B.C. Murders
 "Problem at Sea" (short story from Poirot's Early Cases and The Regatta Mystery)
 "Triangle at Rhodes" (short story from Murder in the Mews)
 "Poirot and the Regatta Mystery" (1936 short story)
 Cards on the Table
 Dumb Witness (also published as Poirot Loses a Client)
 "Murder in the Mews" (short story from Murder in the Mews) is an expanded version of The Market Basing Mystery"
 "Dead Man's Mirror" (short story from Murder in the Mews) is an expanded version of The Second Gong in Problem at Pollensa Bay
 "The Incredible Theft" (short story from Murder in the Mews) is an expanded version of "The Submarine Plans"
 Death on the Nile
 Appointment with Death
 "Yellow Iris" (short story from The Regatta Mystery)
 "The Dream" (short story from The Adventure of the Christmas Pudding and The Regatta Mystery)
 Hercule Poirot's Christmas also published as Murder for Christmas and Holiday for Murder
 Sad Cypress
 "The Nemean Lion" (short story from The Labours of Hercules)
 "The Lernaean Hydra" (short story from The Labours of Hercules)
 "The Arcadian Deer" (short story from The Labours of Hercules)
 "The Erymanthian Boar" (short story from The Labours of Hercules)
 "The Augean Stables" (short story from The Labours of Hercules)
 "The Stymphalean Birds" (short story from The Labours of Hercules)
 "The Cretan Bull" (short story from The Labours of Hercules)
 "The Horses of Diomedes" (short story from The Labours of Hercules)
 "The Girdle of Hyppolita" (short story from The Labours of Hercules)
 "The Flock of Geryon" (short story from The Labours of Hercules)
 "The Apples of Hesperides" (short story from The Labours of Hercules)
 "The Capture of Cerberus" (short story from The Labours of Hercules)
 One, Two, Buckle My Shoe also published as Patriotic Murders and Overdose of Death
 "Four and Twenty Blackbirds" (short story from The Adventure of the Christmas Pudding)
 Evil Under The Sun
 Five Little Pigs also published as Murder in Retrospect

Post World War II 
In chronological order, only the following are set following World War II

 The Hollow also published as Murder after Hours
Taken at the Flood also published as There Is a Tide
 Mrs McGinty's Dead also published as Blood Will Tell
 After the Funeral also published as Funerals are Fatal
Hickory Dickory Dock also published as Hickory Dickory Death
 Dead Man's Folly
 Cat Among the Pigeons
 The Mystery of the Spanish Chest  (short story from The Adventure of the Christmas Pudding  and The Regatta Mystery) is an expanded version of "The Mystery of the Baghdad Chest"
 "The Adventure of the Christmas Pudding" also published as "The Theft Of The Royal Ruby" (short story from The Adventure of the Christmas Pudding) is an expanded version of "The Christmas Adventure"
The Clocks
Third Girl
Hallowe'en Party
 Elephants Can Remember
 Curtain, Hercule Poirot's last case (published in 1975)

Expanded/Adapted stories 

Some Poirot adventures were later expanded into other stories or re-written. They are:
The Plymouth Express (1923 short story) was expanded into the 1928 novel The Mystery of the Blue Train
The Market Basing Mystery (1923 short story) was expanded into the 1936 novella Murder In The Mews
The Submarine Plans (1923 short story) was expanded into the 1937 novella The Incredible Theft
Christmas Adventure (1923 short story) was expanded into the 1960 novella The Adventure of the Christmas Pudding
The Mystery of the Baghdad Chest (1932 short story) was expanded into the 1960 novella The Mystery of the Spanish Chest
The Second Gong (1932 short story) was expanded into the 1937 novella Dead Man's Mirror
The Regatta Mystery (1936 short story) was re-written in 1939 featuring Parker Pyne instead of Poirot
Yellow Iris (1937 short story) was expanded into the 1945 novel Sparkling Cyanide featuring Col. John Race instead of Poirot
Hercule Poirot and the Greenshore Folly (posthumous novella) expanded into the 1956 novel Dead Man's Folly
The Incident of the Dog's Ball (posthumous short story) expanded into the 1937 novel Dumb Witness
The Capture of Cerberus (posthumous short story), originally intended to be the last of The Labours of Hercules but re-written due to its political content

Drama
Other stories were adapted by Christie into plays, sometimes removing Poirot:
Alibi (1928 play) written together with Michael Morton
Wasp's Nest (1937 TV play)
The Yellow Iris (1937 radio play)
Appointment with Death (1945 play) in which Poirot doesn't appear
Hidden Horizon (1944 play) in which Poirot doesn't appear
The Hollow (1951 play) in which Poirot doesn't appear
In addition, the 1930 play Black Coffee was novelized by Charles Osborne in 1998.

Other stories set in Poirot's universe

References

External links
 

Book series introduced in 1920
Hercule Poirot